S. Syed Ghouse Basha is a politician from the Indian state of Tamil Nadu. He belongs to the Dravida Munnetra Kazhagam (DMK). He is a former Member of the Tamil Nadu Legislative Assembly who represented the Madurai Central (State Assembly Constituency). He was elected in a by-election in 2006 caused by the death of the previous member P. T. R. Palanivel Rajan.He hails from Kazimar Street in Madurai and descendant of Kazi Syed Tajuddin hence a huqdar of Kazimar Big Mosque. He is former Deputy Mayor of Madurai Municipal Corporation and former member of Tamil Nadu Waqf Board.

2006 Assembly by-election
Election announcement:

S.Syed Ghouse Basha, the Deputy Mayor of Madurai corporation was announced as the DMK candidate for the assembly bye election. V.Chandrasekar nominated as substitute.

2011 Assembly elections
Syed Ghouse Basha was again announced as Dravida Munnetra Kazhagam (DMK) candidate to contest from Madurai central. He lost to Sundararajan of the Desiya Murpokku Dravida Kazhagam from the All India Anna Dravida Munnetra Kazhagam alliance.

References

External links
My MP MLA

Members of the Tamil Nadu Legislative Assembly
Living people
Year of birth missing (living people)
Dravida Munnetra Kazhagam politicians